Jewel Aich (born ) is a Bangladeshi magician and bansuri player. He is a veteran of the 1971 Bangladesh liberation war that culminated in the birth of his country.

Personal life 
Aich was born in Barisal District, a southern district of Bangladesh. He was the fifth of nine children born to businessman Bijoy Kumar (B.K.) Aich and homemaker Saraju Aich. He was fascinated by the art of magic from a young age, and his interest continued to grow when a gypsy man performed some magic during a visit to Aich's family home. He married Pasha Khoshnu, daughter of Professor Darbesh Ali Khan, who was a popular teacher of Political science department at Dhaka University. They married on 23 July 1985 and the couple has a daughter named Kheya Aich. After marriage, Pasha Khoshnu became known as Bipasha Aich. Both wife Bipasha and daughter Kheya are seen on stage during performances by Jewel Aich.

Naming
His full name is Gouranga Lal Aich. In earlier times, he was known as G.L. Aich. After the liberation war of Bangladesh, Mr. Aich started to write regularly in "Kishore Bangla", a newspaper for youngsters. Back then this newspaper was the only one of its kind. Aich received letters from his fans around the country. One young fan from Rajshahi would send mails addressing him as "Jewel Aich" instead of "G.L. Aich". Finding the name easy, he chose to use it and took permission from his family. Then G.L. Aich became known as Jewel Aich.

Participation in Liberation War
In 1971, Aich and his family were in the middle of the Bangladesh Liberation War. He had left his studies by then. Later Jewel Aich took part in combat with other freedom fighters. He fought under Sector 9. While he was in Bahadurpur (Nadiya) West Bengal, India freedom fighters’ camp, he started teaching students in refugee camps and inspiring the children and the freedom fighters. He also showed magic to entertain and inspire the children of the camp.

Education
In 1956, Jewel Aich was admitted to "Samade Kati Primary School". Later in 1962, he got admitted to "Pirojpur Government High School" in class VI. He completed his Secondary School Certificate examination SSC in the year 1967. Then he would complete his Higher Secondary Certificate HSC from"Pirojpur College", in 1969. Then he enrolled in Jagannath University in Dhaka. Due to the Pakistani invasion, he was unable to sit for his B.A final examination in 1971. He joined the liberation war from his home village. After the Independence of Bangladesh, he received a bachelor's degree from Jagannath University in 1972. He also learned about classical music in Dhaka and went to the US to study filmmaking.

Career 
The art of magic attracted him early in his life. He first saw magic performed by a gypsy man who came to the family house with his company. Soon afterward a circus party came to a nearby village. During the Bangladesh Liberation War, he fought for Bangladesh. After becoming ill, he taught in refugee camps. He was invited to America by the Society of American Magicians to perform a show. After Bangladesh's independence, he joined his own village's "Samade Kati High School". He first joined as a teacher and then had to take charge as the Principal. He taught there from 1972 to 1977.

Professional career
He was fascinated by magic from a young age. When he saw a gypsy man performing some magic during a visit to Aich's village, he was immediately hooked by the art of it. After that he encountered a circus performing in a nearby village, Aich saw a magician perform a trick where it appeared that he had cut the neck of his assistant. He was so impressed by the trick that he designed a special knife which he later demonstrated to his friends by "cutting off" a friend's leg. By the time he enrolled in college; his name had already spread through his district as a magician. He was an amateur performer back then. Magician Abdur Rashid of Lion Circus in Pirojpur was someone who first taught Aich some tricks. Later on, Aich would perform all over the world. Also as a performer, he was motivated by the great Charlie Chaplin and began to convey the message of global brotherhood through magic. 26 March 1986. Jewel Aich performed Magic on the Eve of the Independence day celebration at the National Stadium before a one hundred thousand people audience, with millions of viewers on television.

TV appearance
In 1977, a popular Bangladeshi TV host at that time, Abdullah Abu Syed, invited Aich to perform magical his show. This was Aich's first televised show. He would appear in many more television shows such as – "Ananda Mela," Ityadi, etc. Later he did several of his own TV specials at BTV Bangladesh Television and one of those became the Programme of the Year named ‘Anandamela, Magic World of Jewel Aich’

Popular illusions
 Bipasha Suspended on a Flute
 Buzz Sawing (Cutting Bipasha in half with a Buzz Saw)
 Flying Carpet
 Snowstorm
 Dream of a flood victim mother
 Full moon in stormy night
 Laughter of spring after shedding leaves in the winter
 Flower Garden from Nowhere
 Giant Disecto

Major illusion invention
Cutting Bipasha with an electric Saw
Any audience member levitates on the Flying Carpet
Cutting Comedy. A volunteer comes onto the stage, and is decapitated with a Giant Disecto
The Full Moon in a Stormy Night
Dream of a Flood Victim Mother
The Man with X-Ray Eyes
Magic of Art
The Laughter of Spring after shedding leaves in the Winter
Snowstorm in Canda
A huge flower garden on the floor of the full stage from nowhere

Music
Aich is also an expert flutist. He learned from Ustad Abdur Rahman, Profullo Masid and his son Montu Masid. From 1973, he began to display his talent of tune by playing flute on Dhaka Radio, Bangladesh, Kolkata Radio India, Radio Beijing (China), Deutsche Welle (Germany), BBC (UK), and VOA (USA).

Publications
Aich has co-written books., and also popular articles in many books, magazines and the highest circulated daily newspapers. Jewel Aich has published two books totally written by himself, I am behind the veil (Antaroler Aami) and The magic of winning in life (Jeebon Joyer Jadoo).

Charitable activities
Jewel Aich in his lifetime has performed shows to raise funds to create schools for underprivileged children in rural areas and slums. He also performed for the treatment of cancer patients, patients of kidney disease and has raised funds to build eye hospitals. Environmental campaigns. Support of blood donation with Dhaka Medical College organization called "Shondhani", eye donation; He is working with National Daily Newspaper Prothom Alo's Campaign "Say NO to Drugs". He is involved with multiple projects of the Acid Survivor Foundation of Bangladesh. He actively helps the victims affected by natural calamities such as floods, cyclone etc. by performing to raise funds. From the beginning of his career, he has been involved with UNICEF's Save The Children Foundation and as a result is now a celebrity Goodwill Ambassador of UNICEF Bangladesh. Jewel Aich and his wife Bipasha Aich are the first Bangladeshi couple body donors for Medical Research.

Memberships
 UNICEF's Celebrity Goodwill Ambassadors
 Magic Circle London, UK
 International Brotherhood of Magicians, USA

Acting
ChutirGhonta "When The Bell Rang" (1980) as himself
Humayun Ahmed's Television Drama Eishob Din Ratri as himself
"Shonar Kathi Rupar Kathi" by Atiqul Haque Chowdhury
13 No Bording House

Awards
 Ekushey Padak (1993)
 Quazi Mahabubullah Gold Medal Award (1989)
 The International Conference trophy of Society of American Magicians Boston Massachusetts 4 July 1981, USA
 Best Illusionist Award, ‘Channel I’ Performance Award Dubai, UAE (2003)
 Magic Federation's Reception held for Jewel Aich (28 December 2017)
 Plaque In Appreciation to Jewel Aich Presented by Mayor Annette Strauss Dallas, USA (1988)
 Dhaka Club Ltd. Award for being honored with Ekushey Padak 21 February 2009
 Independence Day Trophy to the Great Magician Jewel Aich, 18 March 2019
 Golden Jubilee Celebration Trophy 1964 – 2014 of Bangladesh television
 Honor to the Great Jewel Aich 1987 Moytree Social Welfare Association
 Sher e Bangla Padak 27 April 1997
 CJFB (The Cultural Journalists Forum of Bangladesh) Lifetime Achievement Award in 2008

See also 

 Magician Razu
 Bangladeshi Magician

References

1950s births
Living people
People from Barisal District
Bangladeshi magicians
Recipients of the Ekushey Padak